Orphism  may refer to:

 Orphism (art), a school of art, also known as "Orphic cubism"
 Orphism (religion), a religious movement in antiquity, supposed to have been founded by Orpheus